The Green Mare is a 1959 French comedy film directed by Claude Autant-Lara, starring  Bourvil, Francis Blanche, Sandra Milo and Yves Robert. The story is set during the latter half of the 19th century and follows two feuding peasant families. It is based on the novel The Green Mare by Marcel Aymé.

The film premiered on 29 October 1959. It had 5,294,328 admissions in France.

Cast
 Bourvil as Honoré Haudouin
 Francis Blanche as Ferdinand Haudouin
 Sandra Milo as Marguerite Maloret
 Yves Robert as Zèphe Maloret
 Julien Carette as Philibert
 Valérie Lagrange as Juliette Haudouin
 Marie Déa as Anaïs Maloret
 Guy Bertil as Toucheur

References

External links
 IMDb

1959 comedy films
1959 films
Films based on French novels
Films based on works by Marcel Aymé
Films directed by Claude Autant-Lara
French comedy films
1950s French-language films
Films with screenplays by Jean Aurenche
Films with screenplays by Pierre Bost
1950s French films